The Department of Agriculture, Food and the Marine is a department of the Government of Ireland. According to the department, its mission is to "lead the sustainable development of a competitive, consumer focused agri-food sector and to contribute to a vibrant rural economy and society". It is led by the Minister for Agriculture, Food and the Marine.

Departmental team
The official headquarters and ministerial offices of the department are in Agriculture House, Kildare Street, Dublin. The departmental team consists of the following:
Minister for Agriculture, Food and the Marine: Charlie McConalogue, TD
Minister of State for Land Use and Biodiversity: Senator Pippa Hackett
Minister of State for Research & Development, Farm Safety and New Market Development: Martin Heydon, TD
Secretary General of the Department: Brendan Gleeson

Overview

In carrying out its mandate the department undertakes a variety of functions including:
Policy advice and development on all areas of departmental responsibility.
Representation in international (especially European Union) and national negotiations.
Development and implementation of national and EU schemes in support of agriculture, food, fisheries, forestry and rural development.
Monitoring and controlling aspects of food safety.
Control and audit of public expenditure under its control.
Regulation of the agriculture, fisheries, food industries and forestry through national and EU law.
Monitoring and controlling animal and plant health and animal welfare.
Monitoring and direction of state bodies engaged in the following areas:
Research training and advice.
Market development and promotion.
Industry regulation and development.
Commercial activities. 
Direct provision of support services to agriculture, food, fisheries and forestry.

In 2017, Joe Healy, the Irish Farmers' Association president, expressed the view that since the UK is Ireland's main trading partner, Brexit could have a "frightening impact" on Ireland's agri-food sector. The UK was the market for 50 per cent, or 270,000 tonnes, of Irish beef exports and if the World Trade Organization (WTO) tariff rates were implemented they would "virtually wipe out" agri-food trade to Britain.

History
The Department of Agriculture was created as a department of the Ministry of Dáil Éireann at one of the first meetings of Dáil Éireann in 1919 with Robert Barton as the first Minister for Agriculture, Horace Plunkett as the department's first vice-president, and T. P. Gill as its first Secretary. In 1899, Plunkett had established the Department's forerunner, called the Department of Agriculture and Technical Instruction (DATI). It was given a statutory basis by the Ministers and Secretaries Act 1924. This act provided it with:

Alteration of name and transfer of functions
Over the years its name and functions have changed several times.

References

External links
Department of Agriculture, Food and the Marine

 
Ireland
1919 establishments in Ireland
Ministries established in 1919
Agriculture
Ireland
Agricultural organisations based in the Republic of Ireland